400 Poydras Tower, formerly known as the Texaco Center, located at 400 Poydras Street in the Central Business District of New Orleans, Louisiana, is a 32-story, -tall skyscraper.
The building is leased by Beau Box Commercial Real Estate.

See also
 List of tallest buildings in New Orleans
 List of tallest buildings in Louisiana

References

External links
 

Skyscraper office buildings in New Orleans
Office buildings completed in 1983
Texaco
Skidmore, Owings & Merrill buildings